Ubaidur Rahman (Urdu: عبيد رحمان); was a Pakistani electrical engineer and broadcaster who is credited as one of the founders of Pakistan Television (PTV) — the state-owned public and commercial broadcasting television network. In addition, he also helped expand the commercial activities of Pakistan Broadcasting Corporation.

Brief PTV history
First in 1961, a major Pakistani industrialist Syed Wajid Ali (owner of the Packages Limited company) initiated a television project in Pakistan by signing a joint venture agreement with Nippon Electric Company (NEC) of Japan.  Ubaidur Rahman, an electrical engineer, was appointed by Syed Wajid Ali to head and develop this television project. Many pilot transmission tests were conducted. Then the control of this project was given to President Ayub Khan's government in 1962. The project people began their work in a small studio within a tent in the Radio Pakistan compound in Lahore, Pakistan. Here a transmission tower was also constructed. Finally, on 26 Nov 1964, the first TV transmission from Lahore took place.

In 2012, former Managing Director of PTV Agha Nasir wrote a book on the history of PTV titled: 'PTV: Another Day, Another World' which also gives details of his experiences while he worked there for over 50 years.

References

Punjabi people
Pakistani electrical engineers
Pakistan Television Corporation executives
Pakistani television people
Recipients of the Pride of Performance
Recipients of Tamgha-e-Imtiaz
History of mass media in Pakistan